Hong Nin Savings Bank (Traditional Chinese: 康年儲蓄銀行) was a bank in Hong Kong, founded in 1921. The bank went into administration in September 1986 following defaults on several loans related to shipping, and was taken over by the colonial Government of Hong Kong. 

Hong Nin was subsequently acquired by First Pacific and became known as First Pacific Bank, now a part of the Bank of East Asia.

References 

 Feng, Bangyan; (2002). A Century of Hong Kong Financial Development. Joint Publishing Hong Kong. .

Defunct banks of Hong Kong
Bank of East Asia
Banks established in 1921
Banks disestablished in 1986